Army Public School Dinjan is a CBSE school located in Dinjan Assam. It is mainly for the students coming from the defence background.

History
The school was started in 1980 with few students with only primary wing. The school got its AWES affiliation in the year of 1994 and in the continuation, 1997 the school was affiliated with Central Board of Secondary Education. In 2009 XI classes was also added to the school. Finally the time comes in 2010 the school shifted to the new big building with many advanced facilities.

Houses
Barak 
Debang 
Lohit 
Kamlang

Facilities
Smart class education
Drinking water
Computer labs
Music rooms

References

External links
Official website APS Dinjan

Schools in Assam
1980 establishments in Assam
Educational institutions established in 1980
Dibrugarh district